Robert Forsyth McDermid (26 September 1895 – 19 August 1952) was a professional footballer who played for Rangers, Dumbarton, Queen of the South and Aberdeen.

Rangers
McDermid began his career at Queen's Park, then joined Rangers where he was a regular member of the side in his first season, 1917–18, finishing as champions. By early 1919 he was no longer in the plans of the Rangers management and was transferred to Dumbarton, then returned to Rangers in 1921 only to be subsequently loaned out to Dumfries club Queen of the South two years later.

Queen of the South
Revitalised by the move, McDermid found inspired form at Queens.

Along with Joe Dodds and Bob McDougall, McDermid was with Queen of the South when they first joined the Scottish Football League in 1923–34 at its lowest level, the newly created Scottish Third Division. Queens finished a creditable third, but their biggest achievement that season was in the Scottish Qualifying Cup. Then considerably more prestigious than now, Queens brought the cup to the South West for the first time in its 25-year history. In the final replay, a surging run through the opposition half and shot from McDermid opened the scoring. Next McDermid's 'dummy' let Bert Lister in to hit the second. McDermid's left foot finish sealed the 3-0 win and Queens were crowned cup winners. The train bringing the players and the trophy back to Dumfries were met by crowds of jubilant well wishers on the platforms and surrounding streets and approaches. The team were then entertained at the Town Hall Buildings on Buccleuch Street.

Aberdeen
Such was McDermid's form at Queens that Aberdeen moved for him in 1925, in what many regarded as the twilight of his career. Aberdonians advocate that it was there McDermid enjoyed the best days of his career – he spent eight years at Pittodrie and became club captain.

After retiring from playing, McDermid became the club trainer.

Career statistics

Club

Appearances and goals by club, season and competition

References

Scottish footballers
Rangers F.C. players
Dumbarton F.C. players
Queen of the South F.C. players
Aberdeen F.C. players
1895 births
1952 deaths
Scottish Football League players
People from Alexandria, West Dunbartonshire
Footballers from West Dunbartonshire
Association football inside forwards
Association football coaches
Aberdeen F.C. non-playing staff
Queen's Park F.C. players